MTR Foods is a food products company based in Bengaluru, India. The company manufactures a range of packaged foods including breakfast mixes, ready to eat meals, masalas and spices, snacks and beverages.

MTR Foods Pvt. Ltd. is a subsidiary of Norwegian conglomerate Orkla. MTR is the acronym of Mavalli Tiffin Room.

History
The company began with the establishment of the Mavalli Tiffin Room (commonly known as MTR) restaurant in Bangalore in 1924 by Yagnanarayana Maiya.

In 1975, when India was under emergency, a Food Control Act was introduced which mandated that food was to be sold at very low prices. This move made it difficult for MTR to maintain high standards in its restaurant business and forced it to diversify into the instant food business by the following year, selling ready-to-eat snacks such as chutneys and rasams.

In 1984, MTR expanded out of Karnataka to the southern states of Tamil Nadu and Andhra Pradesh.

In 2007, Orkla Group, a Norwegian conglomerate, acquired the packaged foods business of MTR Foods.

Growth and profitability
The company is currently an approximately ₹1000 crore company  which is growing at a CAGR of 13%. The company has been listed as a Fortune Next 500 (India's Top Midsize) company for 2004

Business
In 2011, MTR launched a sub-brand called MTR SnackUp with a range of traditional South Indian snacks like Khara Boondi and Benne Murukku.

In 2017, MTR launched a new brand called Laban.

References

External links

MTR Foods on India Brand Equity Foundation

Manufacturing companies based in Bangalore
Indian brands
Condiment companies
Food and drink companies of India
Food and drink companies established in 1924
Indian companies established in 1924
Orkla ASA
Indian companies established in 1976
The Emergency (India)